The England cricket team and the Pakistan cricket team played two Twenty20 Internationals on 19 February 2010 and 20 February 2010 in the UAE. The matches were played at the Dubai Sports City Cricket Stadium.

Squads

T20I series

1st T20I

2nd T20I

References

External links
 Pakistan v England 2009/10 from Cricinfo

UAE
2010 in Pakistani cricket
2010 in Emirati cricket
Cricket in the United Arab Emirates
2009-10
International cricket competitions in 2009–10
Pakistani cricket seasons from 2000–01